The Idaho Sneakers were a professional tennis team in the city of Boise.  They entered the World TeamTennis League in 1994, and the franchise moved to St. Louis, Missouri as the St. Louis Aces after the 2000 season.  The Sneakers played their home matches at the Bank of America Centre in Boise.

Results
1994 - 2nd Place

Players
 Greg Patton, Head Coach (1995–1997); Coach of the Year 1993, 1995
 Michael Robertson (1998)
 Wayne Bryan (1999)
 Jim Moortgat, Head Coach (2000)

Headliners 
 Anna Kournikova
 Bob Bryan (1999)
 Mike Bryan (1999)
 Andy Roddick (2000)

Other players 
 Katrina Adams (1998)
 Manon Bollegraf (1994)
 Jane Chi (1995, 1996, 1999, 2000)
 Gigi Fernandez (1998)
 Amy Frazier (1994-1997)
 Debbie Graham (1998)
 Kim Grant (2000)
 Jonathan Leach (1994-1996)
 Rick Leach (1994-1996)
 Mirjana Lucic (1999)
 Katie Schlukebir (1998-2000)

See also

 World TeamTennis

References

External links
 World TeamTennis History
 Official Team Website
 LogoServer.com
 OurSportsCentral.com

Sports clubs established in 1994
Sports in Boise, Idaho
Defunct sports teams in Idaho
Tennis in Idaho
Defunct World TeamTennis teams
1994 establishments in Idaho
Sports clubs disestablished in 2000
2000 disestablishments in Idaho